Deudorix suk, the Suk playboy, is a butterfly in the family Lycaenidae. It is found in eastern Uganda and western and central Kenya.

The larvae feed on Acacia species. They feed within in galls. The larvae are associated with ants of the genus Pheidole.

References

Butterflies described in 1948
Deudorigini
Deudorix